Symphyotrichum elliottii (formerly Aster elliottii) is a species of flowering plant in the family Asteraceae native to the southeastern United States Atlantic coastal plain where it grows in wetland areas. Its flowers have pink (sometimes lavender) ray florets and pale yellow, then pink, then brown disk florets. NatureServe, classified S. elliottii as Apparently Secure (G4) globally, and of conservation concern in North Carolina, South Carolina, and Virginia.

Citations

References

elliottii
Flora of the Southeastern United States
Plants described in 1841
Taxa named by John Torrey
Taxa named by Asa Gray